The 2018–19 season is Khan Research Laboratories Football Club's 23rd competitive season, 22nd consecutive season in the top flight of Pakistani football, 12th consecutive season in the Premier League, and 23rd year in existence as a football club.

Month by month review

September
Khan Research Laboratories started their season with a 3–0 win over National Bank with a hat-trick scored by Iftikhar Ali Khan. In its second and last league game of September, Khan Research Laboratories drew 0–0 to Muslim.

Position at the end of September

October
Khan Research Laboratories faced newly promoted Sui Northern Gas on 4 October, the match ended in a 1–1 draw with Iftikhar Ali Khan scoring his fourth goal in three matches. Their fourth match of the season was a 3–0 win over newly promoted Baloch Nushki, Izharullah Khan, Umair Ali and Iftikhar Ali Khan scored for Khan Research Laboratories. On 21 October, Khan Research Laboratories faced rivals K-Electric in match that ended 1–1, with Izharullah Khan scoring for Khan Research Laboratories. On 24 October, Khan Research Laboratories faced their longtime-rivals WAPDA, with Khan Research Laboratories winning the game 1–0 after a late-goal from Umair Ali. In their last match of the October, the club faced Pakistan Air Force in a 1–1 draw, after Danish Hameed's goal was equalised by Pakistan Air Force's Irfan Ali at 63rd minute.

Position at the end of October

November
On 1 November, Khan Research Laboratories faced Afghan Chaman, which the club won 3–0 with attacking trio Iftikhar Ali Khan, Izharullah Khan and Umair Ali scoring for Khan Research Laboratories. On 6 November, Khan Research Laboratories defeated struggling Karachi Port Trust 1–0 with winger Umair Ali scoring a late goal for the club. On 16 November, Khan Research Laboratories defeated Pakistan Navy 3–0, with goals from Iftikhar Ali Khan, Izharullah Khan and Zaid Umar. On 19 November, the club faced longtime-rivals Pakistan Army in a 1–1, with Muhammad Shahid scoring equaliser for Khan Research Laboratories at 43rd minute. On 23 November, the club extended its unbeaten run to 12 matches after defeating newly-form and promoted Civil Aviation Authority 2–1 with Iftikhar Ali Khan and captain Zia Us-Salam scoring for the club. On 26 November, Khan Research Laboratories' unbeaten run came to an end after losing 1–0 Sui Southern Gas, with Habib-ur-Rehman scoring the winning goal of the game. On 29 November, Khan Research Laboratories defeated National Bank 1–0 courtesy of an own goal from Misbah-ul-Hassan.

Position at the end of November

December
Khan Research Laboratories faced Muslim in their first match of December, winning the match 2–1 with Umair Ali scoring in 12th minute and Muhammad Shahid scoring a penalty in the 92nd minute of the match, which caused a mob of angry people attacking the referee. On 6 December, Khan Research Laboratories defeated Sui Northern Gas 3–1, Waqar Ihtisham, Iftikhar Ali Khan and Umair Ali scoring the goals. On 10 December, they defeated Baloch Nushki 2–0 with Imran Khan and Zaid Umar scoring for the club. Khan Research Laboratories ended their next three matches with three consecutive draws, 1–1 draw with rivals K-Electric and WAPDA with Junaid Ahmed scoring against K-Electric and Iftikhar Ali Khan against WAPDA and a 0–0 with Pakistan Air Force. On 23 December, Khan Research Laboratories defeated Afghan Chaman 5–0 with Imran Khan and Zeeshan Siddiqui scoring a brace and Iftikhar Ali Khan also scoring, taking his tally to 11 goals. The club played a goalless draw against Karachi Port Trust on 26 December.

Position at the end of December

January
The club lost two consecutive matches for the first time in the season, losing 1–0 Pakistan Army and Pakistan Navy. On 9 January, Khan Research Laboratories defeated Civil Aviation Authoriy 1–0 with a 23rd-minute goal from Umair Ali, leaving them 3 points behind first placed Pakistan Air Force and 1 point behind second placed Sui Southern Gas. On the final day of the league, Khan Research Laboratories defeated title contenders Sui Southern Gas 4–0, with Iftikhar Ali Khan and Junaid Ahmed scoring a goal each and Izharullah Khan scoring a brace. The victory leveled Khan Research Laboratories with first place Pakistan Air Force on 51 points, although Khan Research Laboratories won the league on goal difference, having a goal difference of +28 against Pakistan Air Force's +27.

Position at the end of January

Club

Coaching staff
{|class="wikitable"
|-
!Position
!Staff
|-
|Manager|| Ayaz Butt
|-
|Assistant Manager|| Saeed Sr.
|-
|Head Coach|| Sajjad Mehmood Khan
|-
|Assistant Coach|| Kamran Khan
|-
|Local Coach|| Muhammad Shahid
|-
|Goalkeeper Coach|| Muhammad Zeeshan
|-
|Scout|| Abdul Ghaffar
|-

Other information

First team squad

Season

National Challenge Cup

Khan Research Laboratories were the defending champions of the National Challenge Cup, they were knocked out in group stages after losing 1–0 to Pakistan Civil Aviation Authority in the final group match.

Table

Matches

Premier League

Table

Matches

Summary

Statistics

Appearances

Top scorers
The list is sorted by shirt number when total goals are equal.

Clean sheets
The list is sorted by shirt number when total clean sheets are equal.

Summary

References

2018–19 in Pakistani football